Ericentrodea is a genus of South American flowering plants in the family Asteraceae.

 Species
 Ericentrodea corazonensis (Hieron.) S.F.Blake & Sherff - Colombia, Ecuador
 Ericentrodea davidsmithii H.Rob. - Bolivia
 Ericentrodea decomposita S.F.Blake & Sherff - Peru
 Ericentrodea homogama (Hieron.) S.F.Blake & Sherff - Ecuador
 Ericentrodea mirabilis (Sherff) S.F.Blake & Sherff - Ecuador
 Ericentrodea ramirezii H.Rob. & S.Díaz - Colombia

References

Coreopsideae
Flora of South America
Asteraceae genera
Taxonomy articles created by Polbot